JAM Project ("JAM" standing for "Japan Animationsong Makers") are a Japanese anison band founded on July 19, 2000 by anison singer Ichirou Mizuki. The band is composed of many vocal artists well known in the anime music industry. Aside from the many anime, tokusatsu, and video game theme songs the band has performed together, each member is famous for their own solo performances of Japanese theme songs. JAM Project is known to worldwide audiences for their theme music contributions to Garo and One Punch Man.

History 
JAM Project was founded in 2000 by veteran singer Ichirou Mizuki, who sought to revitalize the fiery spirit of earlier anime songs. He recruited fellow veterans of that space, including Hironobu Kageyama and Masaaki Endoh, who remain members of the group.

The following year, JAM Project began a long association with the Super Robot Wars franchise, performing "Hagane no Messiah" for the PlayStation game "Super Robot Wars Alpha Gaiden. In 2002, Mizuki and Eizo Sakamoto stepped back from the group but three members would join. Masami Okui had released a number of albums and had performed openings for shows including Slayers and Revolutionary Girl Utena. Hiroshi Kitadani, previously a member of the bands Stagger and Lapis Lazuli, entered the world of anime songs via One Piece and its first of several opening themes he has performed for the long-running series. Yoshiki Fukuyama, like Kageyama, Endoh and Mizuki, was a veteran of the anime world. In the 1990s, he was the singing voice of Basara Nekki in Macross 7.

In 2005, the group began another long association with the Garo franchise, writing opening themes for nearly all iterations of the franchise, both anime and live-action. Kageyama voices Madou Ring Zaruba in every release of the show.

In 2007, JAM Project announced plans to perform outside East Asia. Since 2008, the group has performed internationally with regularity, in cities such as Baltimore, Washington, Rotterdam, Abu Dhabi and Paris, typically in conjunction with anime conventions. 2008 also marked the release of "No Border," their first single not connected with an anime or video game.

From 2011 to 2014, Japanese composer and conductor Takayuki Hattori served as orchestral arranger on several albums and tours.

In 2015, JAM Project celebrated its 15th anniversary with a series of concerts that contained 39 songs in its setlist chosen from all their previous albums, the most songs in any of their concerts to date. They also released a CD based on a new ultra-high quality (UHQ CD) standard containing re-arranged and re-recorded hits voted on by fans. The same year, the group exposed itself to a new audience through "THE HERO! ~Ikareru Kobushi ni Honō wo Tsukero~" (lit. "Set Fire To The Furious Fist)", their opening for the first season of One-Punch Man. The music video, filmed in San Francisco, has accumulated more than 50 million views on YouTube.

In 2020, the group celebrated its 20th anniversary with the release of the album The Age of Dragon Knights. JAM Project worked with prominent peers, including Yuki Kajiura, GRANRODEO, ALI PROJECT, angela and members of FLOW. The group also released JAM Project 20th Anniversary Complete BOX, which includes all of the group's albums, a collection of its foreign-language recordings, Blu-rays of a concert and other footage, and a 300-page booklet.

The COVID-19 pandemic caused a planned tour to be scuttled. Kageyama, however, credited the unplanned break with rejuvenating the band's creative drive. That rebirth is the subject of the 2021 documentary Get Over -- JAM Project the Movie.

The group's producer is Shunji Inoue, the founder of Lantis and a former bandmate of Kageyama. JAM Project is managed by HIGHWAY STAR, a Bandai Namco-owned agency that represents Kageyama, Endoh and Kitadani in their solo careers.

Members 
Hironobu Kageyama – founding member
Masaaki Endoh – founding member
Hiroshi Kitadani – joined in June 2002
Masami Okui – joined in March 2003
Yoshiki Fukuyama – joined in March 2003
Ricardo Cruz (semi-regular member) – joined in June 2005
Ricardo occasionally composes and performs with the group. He is heard on songs: "熱風！疾風！サイバスター (Neppu! Shippu! Cybuster)," "Gong," "Stormbringer," "Sempre Sonhando 〜夢追人〜 (Sempre Sonhando 〜Yume Oibito〜)," "レスキューファイアー (Rescue Fire)," "守護神 - The Guardian (Shugonshi - The Guardian)," "TRANSFORMERS EVO," "我が名は牙狼 (Waga Na Wa Garo)," "Herói (Portuguese version of Hero)," "未来への誓い (Asu he no Chikai)," "未来への大航海 〜Great Voyage〜 (Mirai he no Dai Koukai 〜Great Voyage〜," "Buddy In Soul," "決戦 The Final Round (Kessen The Final Round," "Treasure In The Sky," "sweet SWEET HOME," "静寂のアポストル (Seijaku no Apostle)," "Tread On The Tiger's Tail," "Homeward Bound," "ジャイアントスイング (Giant Swing)," and "Drei Kreuz 〜鋼のサバイバー〜 (Drei Kreuz 〜Hagane no  Survivor〜)."

Former members 
He returned to perform in the band's 10th anniversary reunion concert in 2010. 
Rica Matsumoto – founding member; announced on April 7, 2008, that she was taking time off from the band to focus on her solo work, since becoming an indefinite hiatus. She returned briefly in 2010 to help write the 10th anniversary version of "KI・ZU・NA" on the album MAXIMIZER ~Decade of Evolution~.
Ichirou Mizuki – founding member; formally reduced his status to "part-time member" in August 2002, following the band's second live concert. He returned to sing in the single "Stormbringer" in 2006. He also returned to perform in the band's 10th anniversary reunion concert in 2010. The singer passed away on December 6, 2022, due to lung cancer.

Discography

Albums

Studio albums

Best albums

Singles

DVDs

Compilations

Notes

References

External links

Official site 

JAM Project discography on Oricon
JAM Project discography on iTunes

Anime musical groups
Japanese pop music groups
Japanese rock music groups
Lantis (company) artists
Video game musicians
Musical groups established in 2000
Musical groups from Tokyo